The Southern Football Premier League (known as the ODT Southern Men's Premier League for sponsorship reasons) is a New Zealand association football league competition administered by Southern Football involving clubs from the lower half of the South Island of New Zealand. Five of the clubs are from Dunedin and one each are from Wanaka, Queenstown, Mosgiel, Timaru, and Invercargill. 

The league has also previously included an Otago youth development team.

Until 2009, the league was known as the SoccerSouth Premier League. Since the inception of the competition, it has been dominated by Dunedin City Royals and the two predecessor teams which merged to form that club, Caversham AFC and Dunedin Technical.

The league was expanded from eight to ten clubs at the start of the 2022 season, with the addition of teams from Timaru and Invercargill.

As of 2022 the winner of the southern premier league enters to a promotion match against the winner of the Canterbury Premier League. The winner of this match gains a spot in the Southern League.

The team placed last in the Southern Premier League Is automatically relegated to its appropriate regional league. The winners of Fletcher Cup (Otago), Donald Gray Memorial Cup (Southland) and South Canterbury Division 1 (South Canterbury) play in a play off for a Promotion Into the Southern Football Premier League.

ODT Southern Men's Premier League clubs
Teams due to contest the 2022 season

(2) — Denotes club's second team

Champions 

2000 – Caversham
2001 – Caversham
2002 – Caversham
2003 – Roslyn-Wakari
2004 – Caversham
2005 – Caversham
2006 – Caversham
2007 – Caversham
2008 – Caversham
2009 – Caversham
2010 – Caversham
2011 – Dunedin Technical
2012 – Caversham
2013 – Dunedin Technical
2014 – Caversham
2015 – Caversham
2016 – Caversham
2017 - Caversham
2018 - Dunedin Technical
2019 - Mosgiel
2020 - Green Island
2021 - South City Royals
2022 - Dunedin City Royals

Notes

References

2